The 1947 NCAA Track and Field Championships were contested at the 26th annual NCAA-hosted track meet to determine the team and individual national champions of men's collegiate track and field events in the United States. This year's meet was hosted by the University of Utah at Rice Stadium in Salt Lake City.

Illinois repeated as team national champions, capturing their third title in four years and fifth overall.

Team Result
Note: Top 10 only
 (H) = Hosts

See also
 NCAA Men's Outdoor Track and Field Championship
 1946 NCAA Men's Cross Country Championships

References

NCAA Men's Outdoor Track and Field Championship
NCAA
NCAA